The Florida Film Critics Circle (FFCC) is a film critic organization founded in 1996. The FFCC comprises 30 film critics from Florida-based print and online publications. At the end of each year, the FFCC members vote on the Florida Film Critics Circle Awards for outstanding achievements in films released that year. The organization also awards the Pauline Kael Breakout Award, named after film critic Pauline Kael, and the Golden Orange Award for Outstanding Contribution to Film. The FFCC membership includes film critics from Miami Herald, Miami New Times, Sun-Sentinel, Folio Weekly, Bloody Disgusting, WJNO Radio, WTVT, The Daytona Beach News-Journal, FlickDirect, and Tampa Bay Times.

Awards

 Categories 
 Best Actor
 Best Actress
 Best Supporting Actor
 Best Supporting Actress
 Best Animated Film
 Best Art Direction and Production Design
 Best Cast (or Best Ensemble Acting) (1997, 1999–2003, 2014-)
 Best Cinematography
 Best Director
 Best Documentary Film
 Best Film
 Best Foreign Language Film
 Best Score
 Best Screenplay
 Best Song (1996)
 Best Visual Effects

The group also presents the Pauline Kael Breakout Award, named after film critic Pauline Kael, to the most impressive newcomer, and the Golden Orange Award for contributions to Florida filmmaking.

Award breakdown
 5 awards:
 The Power of the Dog (2021): Best Picture, Director, Supporting Actor, Adapted Screenplay, and Cinematography
 12 Years a Slave (2013): Best Picture, Director, Actor, Supporting Actress, and Adapted Screenplay
 4 awards:
 Mad Max: Fury Road (2016): Best Picture, Best Director, Best Cinematography, Best Visual Effects
 Inception (2010): Best Original Screenplay, Best Cinematography, Best Production Design/Art Direction, and Best Visual Effects
 No Country for Old Men (2007): Best Picture, Director, Supporting Actor, and Cinematography
 The Departed (2006): Best Picture, Director, Supporting Actor, and Screenplay
 Brokeback Mountain (2005): Best Picture, Director, Screenplay, and Cinematography
 Sideways (2004): Best Picture, Supporting Actor, Director, and Screenplay
 Adaptation. (2002): Best Picture, Supporting Actor, Supporting Actress, and Screenplay
 Fargo (1996): Best Picture, Actress, Director, and Screenplay
 3 awards:
 Dune (2021): Best Visual Effects, Art Direction/Production, and Score
 Marriage Story (2019): Best Actor, Best Actress, and Best Supporting Actress
 Portrait of a Lady on Fire (2019): Best Picture, Best Director, and Best Foreign Language Film
 The Grand Budapest Hotel (2014): Best Ensemble, Original Screenplay, and Art Direction/Production Design
 Argo (2012): Best Picture, Best Director, and Best Adapted Screenplay
 The Descendants (2011): Best Picture, Supporting Actress, and Adapted Screenplay
 The Social Network (2010): Best Picture, Best Director, and Best Adapted Screenplay
 Up in the Air (2009): Best Picture, Director, and Actor
 Slumdog Millionaire (2008): Best Picture, Best Director, and Screenplay
 The Lord of the Rings: The Return of the King (2003): Best Picture, Director, and Cinematography
 Traffic (2000): Best Picture, Supporting Actor, and Director
 Shakespeare in Love (1998): Best Picture, Actress, and Screenplay
 L.A. Confidential (1997): Best Director, Screenplay, and Cinematography
 2 awards:
 Licorice Pizza (2021): Best Actress and Breakout Award
 Mank (2020): Best Art Direction/Production Design and Cinematography
 Nomadland (2020): Best Director and Actress
 Soul (2020): Best Animated Film and Score
 Uncut Gems (2019): Best Original Screenplay and Score
 Birdman (2014): Best Picture and Actor
 Boyhood (2014): Best Actor and Supporting Actress
 Gone Girl (2014): Best Actress and Adapted Screenplay
 Interstellar (2014): Best Cinematography and Visual Effects
 21 Grams (2003): Best Actor and Actress
 Mystic River (2003): Best Actor and Supporting Actor
 Far From Heaven (2002): Best Actress and Cinematography
 Gangs of New York (2002): Best Actor and Director
 Amélie (2001): Best Picture and Foreign-Language Film
 Crouching Tiger, Hidden Dragon (2000): Best Cinematography and Foreign-Language Film
 State and Main (2000): Best Screenplay and Ensemble Acting
 American Beauty (1999): Best Actor and Director
 Magnolia (1999): Best Picture and Ensemble Acting
 Titanic (1997): Best Film and Cinematography
 The People vs. Larry Flynt'' (1996): Best Supporting Actor and Actress

See also
 List of film awards
 Florida Film Festival
 Film industry in Florida

References

External links
 Florida Film Critics Circle official website

 
American film critics associations
Cinema of Florida
Organizations based in Florida
1996 establishments in Florida